Argyresthia pilatella is a moth of the family Yponomeutidae. It is found in North America, including California.

The wingspan is 9.5-10.5 mm. The forewings are somewhat shining whitish, almost overlaid with brownish gray scales. The hindwings are silvery gray. Adults are on wing from early March to late June in one generation per year.

The larvae feed on Pinus radiata. Young larvae enter a needle of their host plant above the sheath and starts mining. The second to fifth instars are spent mining in the needle in which the first instar completes development. The fifth instar changes needles, causing it to drop. The sixth- and last-instar larvae abandon the needle. Pupation occurs in a small, white cocoon in the litter.

References

Moths described in 1910
Argyresthia
Moths of North America